Steve, Steven, or Stephen Bullock may refer to:

Steve Bullock (British politician) (born 1953), first directly elected mayor of the London Borough of Lewisham
Steve Bullock (American politician) (born 1966), 24th Governor of Montana (2013–2021)
Stephen Bullock (1735–1816), U.S. Representative from Massachusetts (1797–1799)
Steven Bullock (footballer) (born 1966), English association football player